Macanga is a district situated in the north part of Tete Province in the central region of Mozambique. Its administrative center is the town of Furancungo. The district is located in the north of the province, and borders with Dedza District and Lilongwe District of Malawi in the north, Angónia District in the east, Tsangano District in the southeast, Chiuta District in the south, and with Chifunde District in the west. It has a population of 112,551 as of 2007.

Geography
The district belongs to the drainage basin of the Zambezi. The major rivers in the district are the Calidzipiri River, the Lhangue River, the Chiritse River, the Namanzi River, the M'phonfi River, the Modzi River, and the Mavudzi River.

According to the Köppen climate classification, the climate of the district is tropical humid (Cw).

Demographics
As of 2005, 49% of the population of the district was younger than 15 years. 13% of the population spoke Portuguese. The most common mothertongue among the population was Cinyungwe. 80% were analphabetic, mostly women.

Administrative divisions
The district is divided into two postos, Furancungo and Chidzolomondo, which in total comprise seven localities.

Economy
Less than 1% of the households in the district have access to electricity.

Agriculture
In the district, there are 13,000 farms which have on average  of land. The main agricultural products are corn, cassava, cowpea, peanut, tobacco, and sweet potato.

Transportation
There is a road network in the district which includes a stretch of the national road EN222 connecting Furancungo and Mualadzi with the Matema Crossing.

References

Districts in Tete Province